Old Mutual Centre is a skyscraper in Durban, South Africa. The 33 story building was completed in 1995.

See also
Skyscraper design and construction
List of tallest buildings in Africa

References

Skyscrapers in Durban
Commercial buildings completed in 1995
Office buildings completed in 1995
20th-century architecture in South Africa